Shibal Ibrahim (born c. 1977) is an activist for Kurdish rights in Qamishly, Syria. He is a member of the Union of Young Kurds in Syria, a group which organizes pro-reform protests in predominantly Kurdish areas.

On 22 September 2011, Ibrahim was arrested at his family home by plainclothes security officers and is being held incommunicado. His family alleges that marks on his body indicate that he was tortured while in custody.

In January 2012, Amnesty International designated him a prisoner of conscience "detained solely for his activism", called for his immediate release, and launched a letter-writing campaign on his behalf. His arrest was also protested by the Committees for the Defense of Freedoms and Human Rights in Syria.

References

1970s births
Living people
Syrian Kurdish people
Syrian activists
Syrian dissidents
Amnesty International prisoners of conscience held by Syria
Syrian prisoners and detainees